Castells is a Catalan name, the plural form of Castell (castle). It may refer to:

 Castells (surname)
 The Castells, American early 1960s pop band
 Castells, the Catalan tradition of building human towers

See also
 Castel (disambiguation)
 Castell (disambiguation)
 Castella (disambiguation)
 Castelli (disambiguation)
 Castello (disambiguation)
 Castells (disambiguation)
 Castile (disambiguation)